Porthetinae is a subfamily of grasshopers, with genus found in Africa and Asia (Arabia).

Genera 

The following genus are recognised in the subfamily Porthetinae:

 Trachypetrella Kirby, 1910
 Aphantotropis Uvarov, 1924
 Bolivarella Saussure, 1887
 Cultrinotus Bolívar, 1915
 Hoplolopha Stål, 1876
 Lamarckiana Kirby, 1910
 Lobosceliana Dirsh, 1958
 Pagopedilum Karsch, 1896
 Porthetis Serville, 1831
 Puncticornia Dirsh, 1958
 Transvaaliana Dirsh, 1958
 Vansoniacris Dirsh, 1958
 Xiphoceriana Dirsh, 1958

References 

Pamphagidae